Colin Harrison may refer to:

 Colin Harrison (cricketer) (1928–2017), Australian cricketer
 Colin Harrison (footballer) (born 1946), English footballer
 Colin Harrison (ornithologist) (1926–2003), English ornithologist
 Colin Harrison (sailor) (born 1961), Australian Paralympian
 Colin Harrison (writer) (born 1960), American novelist and editor